USS George Washington Parke Custis was a barge acquired by the Union Navy during the American Civil War for use as a balloon-launching platform to spy on Confederate defenses from afar.

This initial balloon experiment by John A. Dahlgren led to intensified balloon spying during the remainder of the war.

Conversion to balloon barge by John A. Dahlgren 
George Washington Parke Custis, a coal barge built in the mid-1850s, was purchased by the Union Navy in August 1861; fitted out with a gas-generating apparatus developed by Thaddeus Sobieski Constantine Lowe; and modified by Dahlgren at the Washington Navy Yard for her service as a balloon barge.

Balloon launched to view Confederate forces in Virginia 
Early in the morning of 10 November 1861, steamer  towed George Washington Parke Custis out of the Navy Yard and down the Potomac River. The next day Lowe, accompanied by General Daniel E. Sickles and others, ascended in his trial balloon from the barge off Mattawomen Creek to observe Confederate forces on the Virginia shore some three miles away.
 
On the 12th Lowe reported:

We had a fine view of the enemy camp fires during the evening and saw the rebels constructing batteries at Freestone Point.

Balloon launches cause technological leap in reconnaissance 
This operation and John La Mountain's earlier ascension from Fanny began the widespread use of balloons for reconnaissance work during the Civil War and foreshadowed the Navy's future use of the air to extend its effective use of sea power.

References

See also 

 Thaddeus S. C. Lowe
 Union Army Balloon Corps
 Balloon (aircraft)
 Observation balloon

Ships of the Union Navy
Balloons (aeronautics)
American Civil War auxiliary ships of the United States
1850 ships